Ibapah Peak is a  summit in Juab County, Utah in the United States. With a topographic prominence of  it is the eighth-most prominent summit in Utah.

See also
List of mountain peaks of Utah
List of the most prominent summits of the United States

References

External links
Ibapah Peak at SummitPost

Mountains of Utah
Mountains of Juab County, Utah
North American 3000 m summits
Mountains of the Great Basin